The 1984 Benson and Hedges Open was a men's Grand Prix tennis tournament held in Auckland, New Zealand an played on outdoor hard courts. It was the 17th edition of the tournament and was held from 9 January through 15 January 1984. Unseeded Danny Saltz won the singles title.

Finals

Singles

 Danny Saltz defeated  Chip Hooper 4–6, 6–3, 6–4, 6–4
 It was Saltz's only title of the year and the 1st of his career.

Doubles
 Brian Levine /  John Van Nostrand defeated  Brad Drewett /  Chip Hooper 7–5, 6–2

References

External links
 
 ATP – tournament profile
 ITF – tournament edition details

Heineken
ATP Auckland Open
1984 Grand Prix (tennis)
January 1984 sports events in New Zealand